Titanium(III) phosphide (TiP) is an inorganic chemical compound of titanium and phosphorus. Normally encountered as a grey powder, it is  a metallic conductor with a high melting point.  It is not attacked by common acids  or water. Its physical properties stand in contrast to the group 1 and group 2 phosphides that contain the P3− anion (such as Na3P), which are not metallic and are readily hydrolysed. Titanium phosphide is classified as a "metal-rich phosphide", where extra valence electrons from the metal are delocalised.

Titanium phosphide can be prepared by the reaction of TiCl4 and PH3.

There are other titanium phosphide phases, including Ti3P, Ti2P, Ti7P4, Ti5P3, and Ti4P3.

Titanium phosphide should not be confused with titanium phosphate or titanium isopropoxide, both of which are sometimes known by the acronym TIP.

References

Phosphides
Titanium(III) compounds